Trendsetter is the second solo studio album by Fler. It released the 23 June 2006 over Berlin label Aggro Berlin and reached No.4 on the German album charts.

A Premium Edition released with bonus CD and a DVD, that features interviews, concerts of backstage reports of Fler. Appearance of Sido, Tony D, Juelz Santana and others, who commenting their relationship with him.

Background 
Four music videos were produced for the songs "Papa ist zurück", "Çüs Junge", "Chef (Clip & Klar)" and "Wir bleiben stehen". The video to "Chef (Clip & Klar)" wasn't shown on MTV and Viva because of its portrayed hardness on the afternoon program, however, it was shown on the night program.

Track listing 
 

Samples
"Wir bleiben stehen" contains a sample of "Dönence" by Baris Manco
Notes
"Gangzta Mucke" replaced the song "Die Schule brennt", on the Premium Edition.

References 

2006 albums
Fler albums
German-language albums